Howard Aaron Gillman is an American political science scholar and academic administrator, currently serving as the 6th chancellor of the University of California, Irvine since September 2014. 

Gillman served as dean of the College of Letters, Arts, Sciences of the University of Southern California from 2007 to 2012, where he was a faculty member in political science and history since 1990.

Early life and education 
Howard Gillman was born and raised in the North Hollywood neighborhood of Los Angeles, California. 

He received a Bachelor of Arts magna cum laude in 1980, a Master of Arts in 1981, and a Doctor of Philosophy in 1988, all in political science from the University of California, Los Angeles.

Gillman was a first-generation college student.

Career 
In September 1990, Gillman was appointed as an Assistant Professor of Political Science at University of Southern California, becoming an Associate Professor in 1995 and a Professor in 2002. In August 2004 he was named Chair of the Department of Political Science, and became Dean of the USC Dana and David Dornsife College of Letters, Arts, and Sciences in June 2007. In September 2014 he assumed his current position as the chancellor of University of California, Irvine.

During his tenure at UC Irvine, Gillman has expressed support for freedom of speech while holding that student opposition to this policy should not be dismissed as infantile. In an interview for the LA Times he stated that it is unfair to describe modern students as "snowflakes", explaining: "The concerns that students are expressing are legitimate, and universities must commit themselves to the creation of safe and inclusive learning environments. But part of the learning environment you are creating in higher ed is one where any idea can be expressed, evaluated, contested and engaged". With Erwin Chemerinsky, dean of Berkeley Law, Gillman co-authored a book entitled "Free Speech on Campus", which argues that "campuses must provide supportive learning environments for an increasingly diverse student body but can never restrict the expression of ideas".

Personal life 
Gilman is married to Ellen Ruskin-Gillman with whom he has two children. Ellen earned a PhD in psychology from UCLA and has conducted research about Down syndrome and autism.

References 

University of California, Irvine people
People from North Hollywood, Los Angeles
University of California, Los Angeles alumni
American university and college faculty deans
Year of birth missing (living people)
Living people